Christopher Alden may refer to:
 Christopher Alden (director) (born 1949), American opera director
 Chris Alden (born 1969), American entrepreneur and co-founder of Red Herring magazine